Donald Vaughan Sinclair (22 April 1911 – 28 June 1995) was a British veterinary surgeon who graduated from the Royal (Dick) School of Veterinary Studies in 1933. He was made famous as the inspiration for the eccentric character Siegfried Farnon in the semi-autobiographical books of James Herriot (Alf Wight), adapted for film and television as All Creatures Great and Small.

Royal Air Force service 

In 1939, Sinclair bought a veterinary practice at 23 Kirkgate, Thirsk, Yorkshire. In July 1940, he hired Alf Wight to run it while Sinclair was undertaking his war service in the Royal Air Force.

However, in order to join up, Sinclair had claimed to be younger than he actually was. It was quickly discovered that his reflexes were not fast enough for him to continue with pilot training. He could have been redeployed within the service, but the fact that he was a veterinary surgeon meant that he was considered more useful to the war effort by resuming his peacetime profession. The severe national food shortage meant that proper veterinary treatment of farm animals received a high priority, and so within four months of joining the RAF he received a compulsory discharge and he returned to Thirsk.

Veterinary practice 
Articles about Alf Wight shed more light on the start of the relationship between the two vets. When Sinclair was to leave for RAF training, he gave Wight all the practice's income in return for looking after it during his absence. His brother, Brian Sinclair (Tristan in the books), was not then qualified. 

After Sinclair was discharged from the RAF four months later, he asked Wight to stay permanently with the practice, offering a salaried partnership, which Wight accepted.

Literary portrayal 
The fictional character Siegfried Farnon is portrayed as outspoken, opinionated, bossy, quick to lose his temper, and also quick to blow over. He is nonetheless basically good-hearted and an animal lover, fond of riding, and infuriated by any suspicion of deliberate cruelty to animals. One recurrent theme in Herriot's stories was Siegfried's criticism of James's flaws, such as forgetting appointments or leaving instruments behind after calls, only for the reader to find that Siegfried is found guilty of the same things. He also is highly forgetful, frequently telling people things and then forgetting them within the same day, to his disbelief when told of this.

When Wight's first book was published, Sinclair was offended by his portrayal and said, "Alfred, this book is a real test of our friendship." (He never called Wight "Alf", represented in the books by Siegfried always referring to Herriot as "James" rather than "Jim".) One of the things he was unhappy about was the name Siegfried, a German name with Wagnerian echoes which, in the 1930s, would have stirred thoughts of Nazis. "Sinclair was so peeved by Wight’s portrayal that at one point he threatened to sue him". Things calmed down, however, and the pair continued to work together until they retired. 

Robert Hardy, who played the role of Siegfried Farnon in the BBC television series, went to visit Sinclair before playing him, and developed the character based upon his observations. However, Hardy reminisced that Sinclair hated the way that Hardy played him, and that, as Hardy claimed, Sinclair was wholly unaware of his own eccentricities. They subsequently became friends, Sinclair forgiving Hardy, and Hardy has said that "I always wished I'd known him before ... It would have helped me to perfect a much more interesting character."

Alf Wight's son Jim wrote in his book The Real James Herriot that Sinclair's character in the novels was considerably toned down, and that Sinclair was even more eccentric than the Herriot books portrayed.

In an interview in 2017, Jim Wight said that "One of the misconceptions [about Alf Wight] was that Sinclair ... was a tyrant and my father was a wimp. Because my father worked harder than Sinclair did, that is absolutely true ... But ... he supported Donald in many ways but he also earned more than Donald. He said to Donald, 'Look, I’m doing all the work. Everything that I do goes into my pocket and everything you do goes into yours.' That’s fair enough, isn’t it?"

Death 
Sinclair killed himself by an overdose of barbiturate on 28 June 1995 at his home Southwoods Hall, near Thirsk, two weeks after the death of his wife Audrey (née Adamson), to whom he had been married for 53 years. His brother Brian (Tristan in the books) had died in 1988, and his friend and partner Alf Wight only four months previously in 1995.

Sinclair was survived by a daughter, Jan, and a son, Alan.

References

Further reading

External links 
 Official James Herriot website (worldofjamesherriot.com)

British veterinarians
1911 births
1995 suicides
People from Thirsk
Drug-related suicides in England
Barbiturates-related deaths
Alumni of the University of Edinburgh